Barkwith may refer to the following places in the East Lindsey district of Lincolnshire, England:

East Barkwith
West Barkwith